The Akron Beacon Journal is a morning newspaper in Akron, Ohio, United States. Owned by Gannett, it is the sole daily newspaper in Akron and is distributed throughout Northeast Ohio. The paper's coverage focuses on local news.  The Beacon Journal has won four Pulitzer Prizes: in 1968, 1971, 1987 and 1994.

History 
The paper was founded with the 1897 merger of the Summit Beacon, first published in 1839, and the Akron Evening Journal, founded in 1896. In 1903, the Beacon Journal was purchased by Charles Landon Knight. His son John S. Knight inherited the paper, in 1933, on Charles' death. The Beacon Journal under Knight was the original and flagship newspaper of Knight Newspaper Company, later called Knight Ridder.

The McClatchy Company bought Knight Ridder in June 2006 with intentions of selling 12 Knight Ridder newspapers. On August 2, 2006, McClatchy sold the Beacon Journal to Black Press. In 2018, GateHouse Media bought the newspaper.

On November 11, 2013, the Akron Beacon Journal printed its last paper in-house. It subsequently used the presses at The Repository in Canton, Ohio, also owned by GateHouse.  it was using the presses at The Plain Dealer in Cleveland.

Notable journalists 

 Herman Fetzer: better known as "Jake Falstaff" to the Akron Beacon Journal, Akron Times and Cleveland Press readers, worked as suburban reporter for the Akron Times, where in 1920 he began his column Pippins and Cheese, taking its title and his pen name from William Shakespeare's Merry Wives of Windsor. While working at the Akron Beacon Journal, his desk sat adjacent to that of writer Josephine van der Grift, columnist of Demi-Tasse and Mrs. Grundy.  
 Sheldon Ocker: Covered the Cleveland Indians for the Beacon Journal. Received the 2018 J. G. Taylor Spink Award; inducted him into the National Baseball Hall of Fame.
 Terry Pluto: recognized as NSSA Ohio Sportswriter of the year multiple times. Wrote more than 20 books, mostly about Northeast Ohio sports.

Awards 
The paper has won four Pulitzer Prizes:

 1968 Pulitzer Prize for Editorial Writing (John S. Knight) for Vietnam War weekly notebook columns
 1971 Pulitzer Prize for General Local Reporting for coverage of Kent State Shootings
 1987 Pulitzer Prize for General News Reporting  for coverage of potential Goodyear takeover: "The Goodyear War"
 1994 Pulitzer Prize for Public Service for race relations series: "A Question of Color"

References

External links 

 McClatchy to Sell the Akron Beacon Journal to Black Press Ltd. (news release)
 Search Akron Beacon Journal Archive

Newspapers published in Ohio
Pulitzer Prize-winning newspapers
Mass media in Akron, Ohio
1839 establishments in Ohio
Black Press newspapers
Newspapers established in 1839
Pulitzer Prize for Public Service winners
Gannett publications